, meaning Heavenly Dragonfly, was a manzai comedy duo consisting of  and . Members of the Yoshimoto Kogyo entertainment conglomerate, they performed on the Fuji TV variety show Mecha-Mecha Iketeru! Their main act was based on arguing and fighting in public.

On July 18, 2006, it was found out that Yamamoto was questioned by the Hakodate West Police station in Hokkaidō on suspicion of statutory rape of a minor. As a result, Yoshimoto Kogyo announced the cancellation of their contract with the agency. The duo was also disbanded. Kato apologized for Yamamoto's scandal on his live TV program broadcast by Nippon Television Network the next day, the whole apology delivered as Kato wept loudly.

In 2016, Yamamoto returned to television after over a decade long hiatus and has resumed activities in the industry. He is also currently a member of Yoshimotozaka46.

References

Profile by Yoshimoto Kogyo)
Fuji TV - Mecha-Mecha Iketeru!

Japanese comedy duos